Sekanjabin, one of the oldest Iranian drinks, is made of honey and vinegar. Sekanjabin is usually served in summer.  It is sometimes seasoned with mint.

Name 

Recipes

Honey sekanjabin 

Ingredients:

 1 1/3 cup honey
 1 cup water
 2/3 cup white vinegar

Method: Simmered and mixed with mint, cucumbers, and lime as in the sugary recipe below. The foam is skimmed off while cooking.

Sugary sekanjabin 

Ingredients:

 2 cups sugar
 2 cups water
 1/2 cup white vinegar
 A small bunch of fresh mint, washed
 2 small seedless cucumbers, washed, peeled and shredded
 Lime rind (optional)

Method:

 In a heavy-bottom pot combine sugar and water. Place on medium heat and stir till sugar is dissolved. Reduce heat and gently boil for 10–15 minutes.
 Add 1/2 cup of vinegar and simmer for 25–30 minutes or until it thickens. Taste and adjust the level of sweetness or sourness of the syrup.
 In the last minute or two add a few fresh mint leaves to the syrup.
 Remove from heat and put it into refrigerator. Remove the mint.
 The syrup is then mixed with ice water, shredded cucumber, and lime.

Serve with much crisp, fresh lettuce on the side. Wine vinegar, particularly some flavoured wine vinegars (e.g. peach), can be substituted for the white vinegar. A bit of rose or orange water can also be added.

See also 

 Oxymel
 Shrub (drink)
 Switchel

References 

Iranian drinks
Vinegar
Honey-based beverages